The following is a chronological list of people who have served as chief executive officer of IBM, an American multinational technology and consulting corporation headquartered in Armonk, New York.

Thomas J. Watson (1914–1956)
Thomas J. Watson, Jr. (1956–1971)
T. Vincent Learson (1971–1973)
Frank T. Cary (1973–1981)
John R. Opel (1981–1985)
John Fellows Akers (1985–1993)
Louis V. Gerstner, Jr. (1993–2002)
Samuel J. Palmisano (2002–2012)
Ginni Rometty (2012–2020)
Arvind Krishna (2020–)

See also

List of chief executive officers

References

External links
 of IBM

 
CEOs
Lists of businesspeople
IBM
Employees by company